Ruslan Ismailov may refer to 

Ruslan Ismailov (sport shooter) (born 1986), Kyrgyzstani sport shooter
Ruslan Ismailov (swimmer) (born 1989), Kyrgyzstani swimmer